Dead Famous: Ghostly Encounters is a British paranormal reality television series that originally aired on LivingTV from June 15, 2004, to June 13, 2006. The program searches for the alleged ghosts of famous deceased people. Curious skeptic Gail Porter and clairvoyant Chris Fleming take a road trip through America looking for the haunted locations where legends of stage, screen, and music reside. Described by the channel as "like a sharper, sexier, and funnier Mulder and Scully", the duo visits places where celebrity spirits are claimed to roam: their hotel rooms, diners, gardens, film lots, and theaters.

The show was produced by Twofour originally for broadcast on LivingTV, but because of its popularity, it can be seen in many countries and is currently aired on the Biography Channel.

Both series 1 and 2 are available on DVD, there is no news on when series 3 will be released.

Episode format

Each week, skeptic Gail Porter and clairvoyant Chris Fleming look into events of paranormal proportions about legends like Frank Sinatra, Bing Crosby, Nat King Cole, James Dean, Lucille Ball, Jim Morrison, Marilyn Monroe, and John Wayne. Part travelogue, the show explores the intimate haunts where the famous dead are said to remain.

In each episode, the show visits three locations that have some link or connection to the dead celebrity, although some seem nebulous at best. All of the locations are researched for their historical connection and presented in a factual way.

Episode list

Season One

Season Two

Season Three

Live
Between 11 and 13 November 2005, Dead Famous broadcast live over three nights from Los Angeles. The show was hosted by Christopher Parker. Gail Porter and Chris Fleming were present during the show. Medium Carla Barron joined the team in this live show.

See also
Ghost hunting
Haunted house
Haunting

References

External links

2004 British television series debuts
2006 British television series endings
2000s British reality television series
Sky Living original programming
Paranormal reality television series
Television series by ITV Studios
English-language television shows